Ekka is the annual show of Queensland, Australia. Ekka or EKKA may also refer to
Ekka (surname)
National and Social Liberation (Greek: Εθνική και Κοινωνική Απελευθέρωσις, Ethniki kai Koinoniki Apeleftherosis, also known by its initials EKKA), a Greek resistance group during World War II
 Ekka (carriage), a one-horse carriage used in India.
 EKKA, the ICAO-code for Karup Airport.
 National and Social Liberation (Ethniki Kai Koinoniki Apeleftherosis or EKKA), the Greek Resistance movement founded by Colonel Dimitrios Psarros.
Ekka Raja Rani, a 1994 Bollywood comedy drama film
Ekka Saka, a 2015 Indian Tulu-language film